The French ironclad Valeureuse was one of 10  armored frigates built for the French Navy (Marine Nationale) during the 1860s. Commissioned in 1867, she was initially assigned to the Northern Squadron (Escadre du Nord), but was soon transferred to the Mediterranean Squadron (Escadre de la Méditerranée), often serving as a flagship. The ironclad played a minor role in the Franco-Prussian War of 1870–1871, blockading the North Sea coast of Prussia and later a Prussian commerce raider in a neutral Spanish port. Valeureuse was reduced to reserve after the war, but was reactivated in 1875 and assigned to the Northern Squadron. The ship was decommissioned two years later and was stricken in 1886. She was scrapped in 1888.

Design and description

The Provence class was designed as an enlarged version of the s with thicker armor, more powerful guns, and better seakeeping qualities. They displaced . Their crew numbered 579–594 officers and enlisted men.

When the French discovered that the British ironclad  had reached  during her sea trials, they decided to add an extra cylinder to the engine of the five ships still under construction in an attempt to achieve .

Armament and protection
The main battery of the Provence-class ships was intended to be thirty  Modèle 1858–60 rifled muzzle-loading (RML) guns, but this was changed to a mixed armament of four  Modèle 1864 RMLs and six  Modèle 1864 smoothbore muzzle-loading guns on the gundeck. Positioned on the quarterdeck and the forecastle were another 194 mm smoothbore and six 164.7 mm Modèle 1858 RMLs, at least some of which served as chase guns. Shortly after commissioning, Valeureuses gundeck armament was probably changed to eight 240 mm Modèle 1864 RMLs.

The conning tower's sides consisted of  armor plates.

Construction and service
Valeureuse (Valorous) was ordered on 16 November 1860 from the Arsenal de Brest, laid down on 23 May 1861 and launched on 18 August 1864. She was commissioned for trials on 27 February 1867, and was definitively commissioned on 25 March 1867. The ship was initially assigned to the Ironclad Division (Division cuirassée) of the Northern Squadron, based in Cherbourg, but then transferred to the Squadron of Evolutions (Escadre d'évolution) of the Mediterranean Squadron in November. Valeureuse became the flagship of Vice Admiral Edmond Jurien de La Gravière on 9 June 1868 and was placed in reserve in April 1870. At an unknown date in that year a premature detonation blew the breech off a 240 mm gun, killing a dozen crewmen.

When the Franco-Prussian War began on 19 July 1870, the ship was assigned to Vice Admiral Léon Martin Fourichon's squadron that was tasked to blockade German ports in the Heligoland Bight. It departed Brest on 8 August and arrived off the British-owned island of Heligoland three days later. The neutral British denied the French permission to re-coal there and the ships were forced to perform it at sea under dangerous conditions. Bad weather and a series of storms beginning in late August prevented the squadron from coaling and the ships were forced to return to France in early September. By then the Prussians were besieging Paris and many of the trained gunners aboard the squadron's ships were transferred to defend the city. The squadron resumed the blockade with reduced crews until December when smaller ships took it over. The blockaders trapped Augusta until the Armistice of Versailles on 28 January.

Valeureuse was paid off on 1 April 1871 in Brest and remained in that status for the next four years. The ship was recommissioned in December 1875 as part of the 2nd Division of the Northern Squadron at Cherbourg. She was decommissioned in July 1877 at Brest and was stricken from the navy list on 26 February 1886. Valeureuse was broken up for scrap in 1888.

Citations

Bibliography

Further reading

1863 ships
Provence-class ironclads
Ships built in France